Elachista occidentalis is a moth of the family Elachistidae. It is found from Fennoscandia to the Pyrenees, Italy and Greece and from Ireland to Poland.

There is one generation per year.

The larvae feed on Carex digitata and Carex ericetorum. They mine the leaves of their host plant. The mine is very narrow at first, but gradually widens to half the width of the leaf. It runs either along the leaf margin or follows the midrib. Pupation takes place outside of the mine. They are greyish green.

References

occidentalis
Moths described in 1882
Moths of Europe
Taxa named by Heinrich Frey